Axel Rosenkrantz (12 December 1670 – 14 November 1723) was a Norwegian landowner and baron.

Personal life
Axel Rosenkrantz was born in Kvinnherad on 12 December 1670 to baron Ludvig Rosenkrantz and Karen Mowat. He was married to Anne  Godtzen from 1709.

Career
Rosenkrantz was the owner of the Barony Rosendal for a period of 32 years, and spent most of his time running his properties. He also served as county governor of Bergenhus amt from 1696 to 1703. He had no sons, and his daughters all died young. After his death the barony was taken over by the Crown, while his other properties were inherited by his wife and relatives.

He died in Kvinnherad in 1723.

References

1670 births
1723 deaths
People from Kvinnherad
17th-century Norwegian nobility
County governors of Norway
18th-century Norwegian nobility
Rosenkrantz family